Merry Christmas, Alex Cross is the 19th novel in the Alex Cross series. Detective Alex Cross is called out on Christmas Eve to deal with a hostage situation that has spiraled out of control. Released on November 12, 2012, the novel was well received by fans and critics alike. However, its commercial success was somewhat lukewarm in comparison to past installments, peaking at #2 and #3 on the New York Times and USA Today bestsellers lists, respectively.

Summary
It's Christmas Eve and Alex Cross has been called out to catch someone who is robbing his church's poor box. That mission behind him, Alex returns to celebrate with Nana, Bree, and his children. The tree decorating is barely underway before his phone rings – a horrific hostage situation is spiraling out of control. Away from his family on the most precious of days, he must call upon every ounce of training, creativity, and daring to save another family. Alex risks everything – and may not make it to the most sacred of days. Hala, from the previous novel, will return as the main antagonist.

Characters
 Alex Cross, protagonist of the series
 John Sampson, Alex's best friend and fellow detective
 Bree Cross, Alex's new wife
 Nana Mama, matriarch of the Cross family and Alex's grandmother, who adopted him at the age of 13
 Fowler (Man who takes his family hostage and pulls Cross away from family on Christmas)

Sequels
Merry Christmas, Alex Cross is followed by Alex Cross, Run and Cross My Heart. Alex Cross, Run was released February 18, 2013 in Hardcover while paperback edition was released July 30, 2013. Cross My Heart will be released initially in Hardcover on November 25, 2013.

Release
The book is the nineteenth novel of the series, and was released on November 12, 2012. However, in some countries, the book was released in late 2011. The book's first 18 chapters can be read at multiple websites, including Patterson's own website: JamesPatterson.com. The paperback edition of Merry Christmas is expected to be released in 2014.

Additional notes
The book is a direct sequel to Kill Alex Cross, with a similar plot – featuring Hala from the previous installment – but does feature new characters, new elements, and a few other story lines. Subsequently, the book was released to mixed to positive reviews. Many fans were critical of the previous installment but nevertheless, mostly all "loyal" fans read the new "one." The book's sequel, Alex Cross, Run was initially set for a September 2013 release date. However, near the end of 2012 – in December – the book was set for a new release date. Its new release of February 18, 2013 was confirmed by author James Patterson at his own official website. The new book's first two chapters can be read at the official website. The first 20 chapters may be released at Patterson's web site as well.

Critical reception
The book has received mixed to positive reviews. Many have criticized its length – 101 pages in paperback. One review stated "Good book, but for no precise villain, it still has potential." The New York Times opined, "one of the best Christmas books ever! It definitely makes up for its overarching-storyline prequel." James Astrect said, "I'm gonna confess, I hated Kill Alex Cross, but Merry Christmas was astonishing ... I could not stop reading."

Merry Christmas, Alex Cross remained on the New York Times Bestseller List for several weeks, with Diary of a Wimpy Kid: The Third Wheel and The Mark of Athena challenging it for #1.

References

2012 American novels

Alex Cross (novel series)
Christmas novels
Little, Brown and Company books